Fun Inc is a book first published in January 2010 by Tom Chatfield, examining video games in terms of their cultural status, potentials as a medium and as a business. It addresses popular concerns such as the debate over violence in games, as well as the questions of games as art, as one of the most fundamental of human cultural activities, and as a potentially transforming force in the social sciences, economics and 21st century life.

The UK edition is published by Virgin Books while the US edition is published by Pegasus Books.

See also
Video game studies
List of books about video games

External links
authors@Google Tom Chatfield's lecture at Google on games as learning engines
Review for the Guardian newspaper by Steven Poole
Review for the Observer newspaper by Naomi Alderman
Tom Chatfield's website featuring a selection of his articles and material from Fun Inc

2010 non-fiction books
Books about video games